Peter Lamptey (born 6 April 1946) is a former Ghanaian international footballer. He was the top scorer in the Ghana league in 1973 and played most of his club football for Accra Hearts of Oak SC and Great Olympics.

Club career
While playing with Hearts of Oak, Lamptey, together with Mohammed Polo, Mama Acquah, Robert Hammond and Anas Seidu were known as "The fearsome fivesome". He was often referred to as the "goal thief" for his scoring prowess. He captained the side to the African Cup of Champions Clubs finals in 1977. He later joined Accra Great Olympics which he played for in his latter years in football.

International career
In 1971, Lamptey was invited to the Ghana national team for the first time. He was in the Ghana team that participated in the 1972 Summer Olympics football tournament. He was the youngest player in the team at 26 years, 144 days and featured in all Ghana's matches played.

Honours 
Accra Hearts of Oak

 Ghana Premier League:  1971, 1973, 1976, 1978, 1979
 Ghanaian FA Cup: 1973, 1974, 1979
 African Cup of Champions Clubs runner up: 1977 
Individual
 Ghana Premier League Top scorer: 1973

See also
Ghana at the 1972 Summer Olympics

Notes and references

Living people
1946 births
Association football forwards
Accra Hearts of Oak S.C. players
Accra Great Olympics F.C. players
Ghana international footballers
Ghanaian footballers
Olympic footballers of Ghana
Footballers at the 1972 Summer Olympics
Ghana Premier League top scorers